Kitchee Sports Club is a Hong Kong professional football club based in Kowloon. It was founded in 1931 and currently competes in the Hong Kong Premier League.

The club has won championships in Hong Kong 11 times, including 6 Hong Kong First Division titles and 5 Hong Kong Premier League titles. It also won the Hong Kong Senior Shield 7 times and the Hong Kong FA Cup 6 times. In the last 10 years, Kitchee won over than 50% of all possible trophies competed in Hong Kong. The club is also the first team from Hong Kong to win a game in AFC Champions League group stage and the first Hong Kong club to advance to the round of 16.

History

Formation

In the late 1920s, a group of Hong Kongers formed a football team in order to compete in the Hong Kong Third Division. It was not until 1931, however, that the team was established as Kitchee Sports Club.

Kitchee was founded as a grassroots organization, as such, they lacked the funding to pay the administrative and facilities costs necessary to become a multi sports club. It was not until 1934 when the club were able to raise the money to rent an office at 130 Johnston Road in Wan Chai, that they were admitted as members of the Hong Kong Football Association.

World War II
In 1939, Japanese bombs accidentally hit Hong Kong during the Second Sino-Japanese War. The club's records during this time were destroyed during the bombing.

As the Pacific War began, Hong Kong fell to the Japanese on 25 December 1941, therefore the club's operations were suspended during the three-year, eight-month Japanese occupation of Hong Kong.

After the Japanese surrender of Hong Kong in August 1945, former members of Kitchee returned to the club. They resolved to help revitalize the Chinese Amateur Athletic Federation of Hong Kong and establish the Chinese Football Association of Hong Kong, the Hong Kong Chinese Football Referees’ Association and the Hong Kong Chinese Footballer's Fraternity.

Post War to 1964

Following the war, Kitchee were admitted into the 1947–48 Hong Kong First Division League where they won the league title, the club's first major trophy. Between 1947 and 1964, the club won three Hong Kong First Division titles, one Second Division title, four Hong Kong Senior Shield's and one Hong Kong Junior Shield.

During this period, Kitchee discovered Hong Kong football legends Yiu Cheuk Yin and Lam Sheung Yee. Yiu led the club to its first two First Division titles and later became known as the "Treasure of Hong Kong Football." Lam spent a total 14 years at Kitchee, split between two spells, and was a part of every Kitchee squad which won a trophy between 1948 and 1964.

1964 to 2003
In 1965–66, Kitchee won only one game while drawing four others in the season, finishing second bottom of the table. The club were relegated after a 17-year spell in the top flight. In the subsequent season, Kitchee slid into the Third Division for the first time in three decades.

In the late 1980s, Law Ding Chun was hired as the new chairman of Kitchee. Law moved quickly to modernize the operations of Kitchee, buying insurance for all of his players in order to provide them with peace of mind in the event of an injury. His changes worked as Kitchee were soon promoted back to the Second Division.

In 1991–92, Kitchee won the Second Division title, returning to the top flight for the first time in 26 years. The squad during this period featured many future Hong Kong internationals including Yau Kin Wai, Chung Ho Yin, Yeung Hei Chi, Yeung Ching Kwong, Dale Tempest, as well as former England international Mark Barham. Kitchee spent three seasons in the top flight before they were relegated along with Kui Tan at the end of the 1994–95 season.

During the 1998–99 season, Kitchee won promotion back to the First Division as well as the Hong Kong Junior Shield. The following year, the squad were led by a backbone of young local players such as Lee Wai Lun, Man Pei Tak and Ng Wai Chiu. However, these were soon poached by bigger clubs and due to inadequate replacements, the performance of the team suffered and Kitchee were once again relegated at the conclusion of the 2000–01 season.

Ahead of the 2002–03 season, former Hong Kong national team manager Chan Hung Ping was hired as Kitchee's manager. He led the team to the Second Division title in his one and only season as manager.

A new golden age
Following their return to the First Division in 2003, Kitchee became one of the most prominent teams in Hong Kong, winning three trophies in two seasons under coach Dejan Antonic: two in (2005–2006) and one in 2006–07 season. The club secured 2nd place in the league, along with league champions South China who had already qualified for the AFC Cup as the Hong Kong Senior Shield winners. As a result, Kitchee became one of two Hong Kong representatives in the 2008 AFC Cup.

Since 2009, the club has been a partner of the Chinese University of Hong Kong in its Injury Prevention and Performance Enhancement (IPPE) program.

Kitchee were invited to take part in the 2010 Singapore Cup, becoming the first Hong Kong team to take part in the tournament. The club lost to Etoile FC 4-6 over two legs in the quarter final.

In the 2010–11 season, under coach Josep Gombau, Kitchee won its first league title in 47 years by one point over arch rival South China, allowing the club to compete in both the 2011 Barclays Asia Trophy, where they lost 0:4 to Chelsea and 0:3 to Blackburn Rovers, and in the 2012 AFC Cup.

Between 2011–14, Kitchee players combined to win the Footballer of the Year award for four straight years. The recipients of this award were Roberto Losada in 2011, Lo Kwan Yee in 2012, Huang Yang in 2013 and Fernando Recio in 2014.

In 2012, Kitchee Foundation submitted a successful proposal to The Hong Kong Jockey Club Charities Trust for a youth football training centre. The club received over HK$44 million from the trust for the establishment of a training ground at Shek Mun, Shatin, New Territories. The Jockey Club Kitchee Centre, as it was later called, opened in 2014. The trust provided 90% of the funding, with the rest coming in part from the proceeds of a Kitchee vs Arsenal exhibition match where they drew 2–2. Apart from serving as the training ground of Kitchee first team and Kitchee Academy, the Centre also provides facilities for the Education Bureau-approved Professional Footballer Preparatory Programme, which Kitchee jointly offers with Yan Chai Hospital Tung Chi Ying Memorial Secondary School, in order to integrate football training into regular school curriculum and schedule.

In October 2012, Arsenal donated HK$780,000 to Kitchee Foundation in support of the youth training centre.

The club won the 2013–14 First Division title. The following season, Kitchee won the inaugural Hong Kong Premier League, the 2014–15 HKFA Cup and the 2014–15 League Cup, completing the treble for the second time.

In 2016–17, Kitchee completed a treble for the third time, capturing the 2016–17 Senior Shield, the 2016–17 Hong Kong FA Cup and the 2016-17 Hong Kong Premier League title. The club promoted long time assistant coach Chu Chi Kwong to head coach role and Director of Football. Brazilian attacking midfielder Fernando won the 2017 Footballer of the Year award while striker Sandro won the Golden Boot.

During the 2017 AFC Champions League qualifiers, Kitchee won against Vietnam's Hà Nội 3–2 but lost in the playoff rounds to Ulsan Hyundai in penalties.

Kitchee directly qualified 2018 AFC Champions League group stage through their HKPL title. To prepare for the competition, the club successfully signed famous Uruguayan footballer Diego Forlán to play for them. The club managed to achieve a 1–0 win over Kashiwa Reysol at home, becoming the first team from Hong Kong to win a game in the history of the AFC Champions League group stage. Domestically, Kitchee won the 2017–18 Hong Kong Premier League, 2017–18 Hong Kong FA Cup and the 2017–18 Hong Kong Sapling Cup, completing a treble for the second consecutive season and the fourth in club history.

In 2021, the club signed former Montenegrin international Dejan Damjanović, who won the Golden Boot with 17 goals in his first season with the club. The Bluewaves won the 2020–21 Hong Kong Premier League title on the final day of the season, besting rivals Eastern 2-0. Kitchee followed up their domestic success by accumulating 11 poiunts in their 2021 AFC Champions League, a record for a Hong Kong club in the competition.

During the 2022 AFC Champions League, Kitchee made history by becoming the first Hong Kong club to advance to the round of 16.

Current squad

First team

 

 FP

 FP
 FP
 FP
 FP
 FP
 FP

 FP

 LP

 

 FP

Remarks:
LP These players are considered as local players in Hong Kong domestic football competitions.
FP These players are registered as foreign players.

Out on loan

 (on loan at Real Unión)
 (on loan at Southern)
 (on loan at Southern)
 (on loan at Southern)

 (on loan at Southern)
 (on loan at Southern)
 (on loan at HK U23)

Club culture

Supporters 

Kitchee's supporter group is known as "Ultras Bluewave". The group was formed in 2015, as is active at home and away matches in both the Hong Kong Premier League, and in continental competition.

Honours

Domestic League
Hong Kong Premier League
Champions (5): 2014–15, 2016–17, 2017–18, 2019–20, 2020–21
Runners-up (1): 2015–16
Hong Kong First Division (Tier 1)
Champions (6): 1947–48, 1949–50, 1963–64, 2010–11, 2011–12, 2013–14
Runners-up (7): 1952–53, 1954–55, 1956–57, 2003–04, 2006–07, 2008–09, 2012–13
Hong Kong Second Division (Tier 2)
Champions (3): 1950–51, 1991–92, 2002–03
Hong Kong Third Division (Tier 3)
Champions (1): 1997–98

Other Domestic League
Hong Kong Women's League
Champions (1): 2017-18
Hong Kong Premier Youth League U16
Champions (1): 2020-21
Hong Kong Premier Youth League U18
Runners-up (1): 2020-21

Domestic Cup competitions
Hong Kong Senior Challenge Shield
Champions (8): 1949–50, 1953–54, 1959–60, 1963–64, 2005–06, 2016–17, 2018–19, 2022–23
Runners-up (6): 1948–49, 1951–52, 1955–56, 2007–08, 2009–10, 2014–15
Hong Kong FA Cup
Champions (6): 2011–12, 2012–13, 2014–15, 2016–17, 2017–18, 2018–19
Runners-up (2): 2003–04, 2013–14
Hong Kong Sapling Cup
Champions (2): 2017–18, 2019–20
Hong Kong League Cup
Champions (5): 2005–06, 2006–07, 2011–12, 2014–15, 2015–16
Hong Kong Junior Challenge Shield
Champions (2): 1951–52, 1998–99
Hong Kong Community Cup
Champions (2): 2017, 2018 
Runners-up (3): 2014, 2015, 2016
Hong Kong Community Shield
Champions (1): 2009

Other Domestic Cup competitions
The HKFC International Soccer Sevens Main Tournament
Champions (1): 2011
Hong Kong Women's First Division League Cup
Champions (1): 2021–22
Hong Kong Women's League FA Cup
Champions (1): 2018–19
Hong Kong Premier Youth League Cup U18
Champions (1): 2021–22
Hong Kong Premier Youth League Cup U16
Champions (1): 2021–22
Hong Kong Premier Youth League Cup U14
Champions (1): 2021–22

All-time Player Records

Most league appearances 
As of 19 August 2022; active players still with the club in bold.

Most league goals 
As of 17 January 2023; active players still with the club in bold.

AFC Champions League and AFC Cup Tournament record
All results list Kitchee's goal tally first.

Invitational Tournament record
All results list Kitchee's goal tally first.

Club officials

Club Senior staff

Coaching staff

Basic Information

History of Head Coaches

Notable seasons

Kit manufacturers and shirt sponsors

Asia Football Clubs Ranking

Footnotes

References

External links
Kitchee SC Official Website

 
1931 establishments in Hong Kong
Association football clubs established in 1931
Football clubs in Hong Kong
Hong Kong Premier League